Rastrakavi Ramdhari Singh Dinkar College of Engineering (RRSDCE), is a government engineering college under Department of Science and Technology, Bihar. College was started in the year 2016. The college is named after the name of Ramdhari Singh Dinkar. It is situated in Begusarai, Bihar. It is affiliated with Aryabhatta Knowledge University, Patna and approved by All India Council for Technical Education.

Admission 
Admission in the college is done through the Bihar Combined Entrance Competitive Examination Board (BCECEB). To participate in the counselling process of the Board, students must have appeared in Joint Entrance Examination – Main of that admission year.

Disciplines 

 Civil Engineering
 Computer Science & Engineering
 Electrical & Electronics Engineering
 Mechanical Engineering
 Chemical Engineering

Departments 
 Physics
 Chemistry
 Mathematics
 Humanities

References

External links 
 Official website
 BCECE Board website
 DST, Bihar website

Engineering colleges in Bihar
Colleges affiliated to Aryabhatta Knowledge University
Begusarai district
2016 establishments in Bihar
Educational institutions established in 2016